This is a list of all the former National Forests in the United States. These units were renamed, disestablished, combined with other units or split apart during reorganizations of the U.S. Forest Service system. There was particular turnover during the first decade of the 20th century, when the forest system was reorganized several times, most notably on July 1, 1908. In the 1920s a short-lived program created several National Forests from excess portions of military facilities. Within two years these transfers were reconsidered and rescinded.

A

Absaroka National Forest
Afognak Forest
Alabama National Forest
Alamo National Forest
Alexander Archipelago National Forest
Apache National Forest
Aquarius National Forest
Arkansas National Forest
Ashland National Forest

B

Baboquivari National Forest
Baker City Forest Reserve
Battlement National Forest
Battlement Mesa National Forest
Battlement Mesa Forest Reserve
Bear Lodge National Forest
Bear River National Forest
Beartooth National Forest
Beaver National Forest
Bellevue-Savanna National Forest
Benning National Forest
Big Belt National Forest
Big Burros National Forest
Big Hole National Forest
Bitter Root National Forest
Black Mesa National Forest
Black Warrior National Forest
Blackfeet National Forest
Blue Mountains National Forest
Bonneville National Forest
Boone National Forest
Bull Run National Forest
Bridger National Forest

C

Cabinet National Forest
Cache National Forest
Calaveras Bigtree National Forest
California National Forest
Cascade National Forest
Cascade Range Forest Reserve
Cassia National Forest
Cave Hills National Forest
Charleston National Forest
Chelan National Forest
Chenismus Forest Reserve
Cheyenne National Forest
Chiricahua National Forest
Clark National Forest
Cochetopa National Forest
Cochetopah National Forest
Colorado National Forest
Columbia National Forest
Coquille National Forest
Crater National Forest
Crazy Mountain National Forest
Crook National Forest
Crow Creek National Forest

D

Dakota National Forest
Datil National Forest
Diamond Mountain National Forest
Dismal River National Forest
Dix National Forest
Dragoon National Forest
Durango National Forest

E

Ekalaka National Forest
Elkhorn National Forest
Eustis National Forest

F

Fillmore National Forest
Fish Lake National Forest
Flathead Forest Reserve
Florida National Forest
Fruita National Forest

G

Gallinas National Forest
Garces National Forest
Garden City National Forest
Gila River National Forest
Glenwood National Forest
Goose Lake National Forest
Grand Canyon National Forest
Grantsville National Forest
Grover Island
Guadalupe National Forest

H

Harney National Forest
Hell Gate National Forest
Henry's Lake National Forest
Heppner National Forest
Highwood Mountains National Forest
Holy Cross National Forest
Huachuca National Forest
Humphreys National Forest

I

Idaho National Forest
Imnaha National Forest
Independence National Forest

J

Jackson National Forest
Jefferson National Forest (Montana)
Jemez National Forest

K

Kansas National Forest
Kern National Forest
Knox National Forest

L

La Sal National Forest
La Salle National Forest
Lake Tahoe National Forest
Las Animas National Forest
Lassen Peak National Forest
Leadville National Forest
Lee National Forest
Lemhi Forest Reserve
Lewis and Clarke Forest Reserve
Little Belt National Forest
Little Belt Mountains National Forest
Little Rockies National Forest
Logan National Forest
Long Pine National Forest

M

McClellan National Forest
Madison National Forest
Magdalena National Forest
Manti National Forest
Manzano National Forest
Marquette National Forest
Maury Mountain Forest Reserve
Meade National Forest
Michigan National Forest
Minam National Forest
Minidoka National Forest
Minnesota National Forest
Missoula National Forest
Moapa National Forest
Monitor National Forest
Mono National Forest
Monterey National Forest
Montezuma National Forest
Monticello National Forest
Mount Baker National Forest
Mount Graham National Forest
Mount Rainier Forest Reserve
Mount Taylor National Forest

N

Natural Bridge National Forest
Nebo National Forest
Nevada National Forest
Niobrara National Forest
North Platte National Forest

0

Oregon National Forest
Otter National Forest
Ouray National Forest

P

Pacific Forest Reserve
Palisade National Forest
Palouse National Forest
Park Range National Forest
Paulina National Forest
Payson National Forest
Pecos National Forest
Peloncillo National Forest
Pend d'Oreille National Forest
Pend Oreille National Forest
Pike's Peak Forest Reserve
Pikes Peak Timber Land Reserve
Pinal Mountains National Forest
Pine Mountain and Zaka Lake Forest Reserve
Pine Plains National Forest
Pinnacles National Forest
Plum Creek Timber Land
Pocatello National Forest
Port Neuf National Forest
Powell National Forest
Priest River National Forest
Pryor Mountains National Forest

R

Raft River National Forest
Rainier National Forest
Reserve National Forest
Ruby National Forest
Ruby Mountains National Forest

S

Sacramento National Forest
Salmon River National Forest
Salt Lake National Forest
San Benito National Forest
San Bernardino Forest Reserve
San Francisco Mountains National Forest
San Gabriel National Forest
San Jacinto National Forest
San Luis National Forest
San Luis Obispo National Forest
San Mateo National Forest
Santa Barbara National Forest
Santa Catalina National Forest
Santa Rita National Forest
Santa Rosa National Forest
Santa Ynez Forest Reserve
Santiam National Forest
Savanna National Forest
Selway National Forest
Sevier National Forest
Shenandoah National Forest
Short Pine National Forest
Sierra Madre National Forest
Sioux National Forest
Sitgreaves National Forest
Slim Buttes National Forest
Snoqualmie National Forest
Snowy Mountains National Forest
Sopris National Forest
Stony Creek National Forest
Sundance National Forest

T

Taos National Forest
Teton National Forest
Tillamook National Forest
Tobyhanna National Forest
Toquima National Forest
Trabuco Cañon National Forest
Trabuco Canyon National Forest
Trinity National Forest
Tumacacori National Forest
Tusayan National Forest

U

Uintah National Forest
Unaka National Forest
Upton National Forest

V

Vegas National Forest
Verde National Forest
Vernon National Forest

W

Wallowa National Forest
Warner Mountains National Forest
Washakie National Forest
Washington National Forest
Weiser National Forest
Wenaha National Forest
Wet Mountains National Forest
White River Plateau Timber Land Reserve
Whitman National Forest
Wichita National Forest

Y

Yellowstone National Forest
Yuba Forest Reserve

Z

Zuni National Forest

See also
List of U.S. National Forests

References

External links
Forest History Society
Listing of the National Forests of the United States and Their Dates (Forest History Society website) Text from Davis, Richard C., ed. Encyclopedia of American Forest and Conservation History. New York: Macmillan Publishing Company for the Forest History Society, 1983. Vol. II, pp. 743-788.

Former National Forests of the United States
Former